Franziska Michor (born 1982) is an Austrian-American computational biologist who is a Professor in the Department of Data Science at the Dana–Farber Cancer Institute. She serves as Director of the Physical Sciences-Oncology Center and the Center for Cancer Evolution.

Education and early career 
Michor was born in Vienna. Her father was a mathematician and her mother was a nurse. As a child she became interested in mathematics, and inspire to follow a scientific career that helped others. Michor was an undergraduate student in mathematics and molecular biology at the University of Vienna. During her degree she spent a year at the University of Trieste, where she studied medical biotechnology. She moved to the Institute for Advanced Study as a graduate student, where she worked in theoretical biology. Michor was a doctoral researcher in Harvard University, where she was based in the Department of Organismic and Evolutionary Biology. Her thesis considered the evolutionary dynamics of cancer. She identified the time required for the genes within cancer cells to mutate and become protective against cancer.

Research and career 
Michor completed her doctoral research in less than three years, after which she was made a Junior Fellow in the Harvard Society of Fellows. Her early work considered the development of a mathematical model to study the evolution of cells that lead to the end stage of chronic myelogenous leukemia. Specifically, Michor sought to understand why certain patients failed to improve after treatment with Gleevec. Michor was the first researcher to be honoured with the Austrian Scientists and Scholars in North America (ASciNA) award.

In 2007, Michor was appointed to the faculty at the Memorial Sloan Kettering Cancer Center, and as assistant professor at the Weill Cornell Graduate School of Medical Sciences. Her laboratory consider the evolutionary dynamics of cancer, including its initiation, progression, response to therapy, and emergence of resistance. She moved to the Dana–Farber Cancer Institute in 2010, where she was promoted to Professor in 2015.

Michor is on the steering committee of the American Association for Cancer Research Cancer Evolution Working.

Personal life
Michor is married to Roland G. Fryer Jr., a professor of economics who, at age 30, became the youngest African-American to be given tenure at Harvard University.

Awards and honors 
 2004 Fred Hutchinson Cancer Research Center Harold M. Weintraub Graduate Student Award
 2005 Elected Junior Fellow of the Harvard Society of Fellows
 2007 Theodosius Dobzhansky Prize of the Society for the Study of Evolution
 2008 Austrian Scientists and Scholars in North America (ASciNA) Award 
 2009 Leon Levy Foundation Young Investigator Award
 2010 Gerstner Young Investigator Award
 2012 Alice Hamilton Award
 2012 Speaker at TEDMED
 2015 Vilcek Prize for Creative Promise in Biomedical Science
 2015 Carnegie Corporation of New York Great Immigrants Award
 2015 NYSCF - Robertson Stem Cell Prize
 2016 	The 36th Annual AACR Award for Outstanding Achievement in Cancer Research

Selected publications

References

External link 

1983 births
Living people
21st-century women scientists
Scientists from Vienna
Harvard Graduate School of Arts and Sciences alumni

Computational biologists